Pamela Rooke (23 June 1955 – 3 April 2022), also known as Jordan and Jordan Mooney, was an English model and actress known for her work with Vivienne Westwood and the SEX boutique in the Kings Road area of London in the mid-1970s, and for attending many of the early Sex Pistols performances. Her style and dress sense—a bleached platinum-blonde bouffant hairdo with dark raccoon-like eye make-up—made her a highly visible icon of the London punk subculture. Along with Johnny Rotten, Soo Catwoman and Siouxsie Sioux, she is credited with creating the London punk look.

Biography
She took the single name Jordan at the age of 14, in Seaford, East Sussex. When Jordan first walked into 430 King's Road, London, wearing gold stilettos, a see-through net skirt, with a white bouffant hairstyle, it had just changed to SEX, 

Rooke commuted for two hours each day to London from Seaford. She recalled that her punk image caused problems for her:

In the late 1970s, she served as an early manager for Adam and the Ants. She recorded the track "Lou" (about Lou Reed) as a guest lead vocalist with the band for BBC Radio 1 DJ John Peel's Peel Sessions and often performed the song live with them from mid-1977 up to May 1978 when she left the band. In the 1980s, she managed the band Wide Boy Awake, in which her then-husband Kevin Mooney was a guitarist. Mooney had previously been the bassist in Adam and the Ants.

She made a cameo appearance in Derek Jarman's debut film Sebastiane, and played the lead role in his follow-up film Jubilee as the punk "anti-historian" Amyl Nitrate (named after the drug amyl nitrite). She can also be seen in Julien Temple's The Great Rock and Roll Swindle wearing an "Only anarchists are pretty" T-shirt and appearing on stage with the Sex Pistols during their first live television performance of "Anarchy in the U.K." in August 1976.

Maisie Williams plays Rooke in the FX Network series Pistol, which portrays Rooke's political influence and her ethos of turning the male gaze in on itself, weaponizing the male gaze.

In 1984, after divorcing Mooney, she returned to Seaford, breeding Burmese cats and working as a veterinary nurse. Rooke's autobiography, Defying Gravity: Jordan's Story, written with Cathi Unsworth, was published by Omnibus Press in 2019.

Rooke died in East Sussex on 3 April 2022 from cholangiocarcinoma, aged 66.

Notes

External links
Women in Punk: Jordan

1955 births
2022 deaths
English female models
People from Seaford, East Sussex
British punk music
Bromley Contingent
20th-century English actresses
Women in punk
Deaths from cancer in England
Deaths from cholangiocarcinoma
English music managers